The following is a list of Hong Kong television programmes in 2012. The list includes television drama and variety programme debuts and endings.

Top ten serial dramas in ratings
The following is a list of Hong Kong's highest-rated serial dramas of 2012 according to the drama's average ratings. The list also includes the ratings of the dramas' premiere and finale weeks, finale episode, as well as the average overall count of Hong Kong viewers (in millions) per drama. Rating figures are rounded to the nearest number.

TVB

Serial drama debuts

Serial drama endings

Variety programme debuts

Variety programme endings

ATV

Serial drama debuts

Variety programme debuts

RTHK

Serial drama debuts

References